Spondylopathies are disorders of the vertebrae. When involving inflammation, it can be called spondylitis. In contrast, a spondyloarthropathy is a condition involving the vertebral joints, but many conditions involve both spondylopathy and spondyloarthropathy.

Examples include ankylosing spondylitis and spondylosis.

See also
 Dorsopathies
 Spondyloarthropathy
 Spondylolisthesis
 Spondylosis
 Spondylitis
 Spondylolysis

References

External links 

Vertebral column disorders